Thelma J. Chalifoux (February 8, 1929 – September 22, 2017) was a Canadian teacher and senator.

Biography
Chalifoux was born in Calgary, Alberta on February 8, 1929. One of five children, her mother, Helené, helped support the family by trading garden-grown vegetables. Her father, Paul Villeneuve, was a residential school survivor and served in the First World War working as a carpenter and farm hand. She studied sociology at Lethbridge Community College and later took courses in construction estimation at the Southern Alberta Institute of Technology.

Chalifoux was a social justice activist and politician, and an active figure in the Métis community. As an employee of the government agency Company of Young Canadians, she worked to advance community development initiatives in northern communities and advocated for improved housing conditions. Chalifoux co-founded the Slave Lake Friendship Centre, assisting women struggling with alcoholism and domestic abuse. She additionally championed the teaching of Cree in northern schools. Along with her community work, Chalifoux produced programming focused on Métis culture and history. She was the first woman to host a weekly show "Smoke Signals from the Peace" on Peace River's CKYL Radio and was the co-producer of the Allarcom series Our Native Heritage. In 1994 she founded and became a senior partner of Chalifoux and Associates Educational and Economic Consulting. She also owned Secret Garden Originals, a craft, and floral design business.

Chalifoux was appointed to the Canadian Senate on the advice of Prime Minister Jean Chrétien on November 26, 1997, making her the first Indigenous woman and fourth Metis person to serve in the Canadian Senate, following Richard Hardisty, William Albert Boucher, and Gerry St. Germain. She held the position until 2004 when, at the age of 75, she retired and returned to Alberta. The following year Alberta Venture magazine ranked her number 8 on their list of 50 Greatest Albertans.

After her retirement, she founded the Michif Cultural and Resource Institute now the Michif Cultural Connections Company, an organization dedicated to preserving and sharing Métis history of Alberta. Chalifoux was the first woman to receive the National Aboriginal Achievement Award – known today as the Indspire Award - in 1994.

Chalifoux died at the age of 88 surrounded by her family on September 22, 2017, after a period of failing health.

On May 8, 2018, the Edmonton Public School Board of Trustees voted to name the new Thelma Chalifoux School (grade 7- 9) in Larkspur in her honour.

Métis Association
Chalifoux joined the Métis Association in the late 1960s during the early growth of local-level activism within Métis communities. Upon joining, Chalifoux strove to fix major issues affecting the Metis by advocating within governmental  bodies. She argued that there were inadequate levels of social welfare programs despite clear indications that Métis communities were among a large majority of those in Canada not meeting their basic needs. Chalifoux, advocated for the increase of affordable shelter, food, and higher welfare grants and subsidies for Métis families. She later focused her efforts on the formation of the Welfare Unit, a group of investigators that looked into complaints concerning the Alberta Government Welfare Department's dealings with Métis communities and families. Her efforts exposed welfare injustices like those that occurred at Fort Chippewa concerning the lack of funds given to various families in desperate need of assistance. Her investigations revealed accounts like that of a widow parenting "five children [and was given] $60 a month to live on." She took a special interest in helping disadvantaged Métis women who had fallen through the cracks of government bureaucracy and otherwise would have remained voiceless.

Awards and honours
National Aboriginal Achievement Award (1995)
Métis National Council Lifetime Achievement Award (2014).
Honorary Doctorate, University of Toronto (2004). (Awarded for her advocacy work.)

References

External links
Interview and photos from her office when she was in the Senate of Canada
 

1929 births
2017 deaths
 Canadian Métis people
 Canadian senators from Alberta
 Women members of the Senate of Canada
 Liberal Party of Canada senators
Métis politicians
 People from St. Albert, Alberta
 Politicians from Calgary
 Women in Alberta politics
Indspire Awards
21st-century Canadian politicians
21st-century Canadian women politicians
 Indigenous Canadian senators